This is a list of high schools in the state of Washington.

Adams County
Othello High School, Othello
Lind-Ritzville High School, Ritzville
Washtucna High School, Washtucna

Asotin County
Asotin Junior Senior High School, Asotin
Clarkston High School, Clarkston

Benton County
Benton/Franklin Juvenile Justice Center, Kennewick
Hanford High School, Richland
Kamiakin High School, Kennewick
Kennewick High School, Kennewick
Kiona-Benton City High School, Benton City
Liberty Christian School, Richland
Prosser Falls Education Center, Prosser
Prosser High School, Prosser
Richland High School, Richland
River View High School, Kennewick
Rivers Edge High School, Richland
Southridge High School, Kennewick
Tri City Area Vocational Skills Center, Kennewick
Delta High School, Pasco (Regional STEM Highschool)

Chelan County
Cascade High School, Leavenworth
Cashmere High School, Cashmere
Chelan High School, Chelan
Entiat Junior Senior High School, Entiat
Manson Junior Senior High School, Manson
Vocational Skills Center North Central, Wenatchee
Wenatchee High School, Wenatchee
Westside High School, Wenatchee

Clallam County
Clallam Bay High School, Clallam Bay
Crescent High School, near Port Angeles
Forks High School, Forks
Port Angeles High School, Port Angeles
Quileute Tribal School, La Push
Sequim High School, Sequim
La Push High School, La Push

Clark County
Battle Ground High School, Battle Ground
CAM Academy, Battle Ground
Camas High School, Camas
Columbia Adventist Academy, Battle Ground
Columbia River High School, Vancouver
Cornerstone Christian Schools, Vancouver
Evergreen High School, Vancouver
Excelsior High School, Washougal
Firm Foundation Christian School, Battle Ground
Fort Vancouver High School, Vancouver
Heritage High School, Vancouver
Hockinson High School, Brush Prairie
Hudson's Bay High School, Vancouver
King's Way Christian Schools, Vancouver
La Center High School, La Center
Lewis and Clark High School, Vancouver
Mountain View High School, Vancouver
Prairie High School, Brush Prairie
Ridgefield High School, Ridgefield
Seton Catholic High School, Vancouver
Skyview High School, Vancouver
Union High School, Vancouver
Vancouver Christian High School, Vancouver (1997—2012)
Vancouver iTech Preparatory, Vancouver
Vancouver School of Arts and Academics,  Vancouver
Washougal High School, Washougal

Columbia County
Dayton High School, Dayton

Cowlitz County
Cornerstone Community Christian School, Kelso
Castle Rock High School, Castle Rock
Kalama High School, Kalama
Kelso High School, Kelso
Loowit High School, Kelso
R. A. Long High School, Longview
Mark Morris High School, Longview
Toutle Lake High School, Toutle
Woodland High School, Woodland

Douglas County
Bridgeport High School, Bridgeport
Eastmont High School, East Wenatchee
Mansfield High School, Mansfield
Waterville High School, Waterville

Ferry County
Curlew High School, Curlew
Inchelium High School, Inchelium
Republic Junior-Senior High School, Republic

Franklin County
Ainsworth High School, Pasco (Ainsworth) (defunct)
Chiawana High School, Pasco
Connell High School, Connell
Eltopia High School, Eltopia (defunct, closed after 1963-64 school year)
Kahlotus High School, Kahlotus
Palouse Junction High School, Connell
Pasco High School, Pasco
Tri-Cities Prep, Pasco
Delta High School, Pasco (Regional STEM Highschool)

Garfield County
Pomeroy Junior Senior High School, Pomeroy

Grant County
Almira-Coulee-Hartline High School, Coulee City
Ephrata Senior High School, Ephrata
Lake Roosevelt High School, Coulee Dam
Moses Lake High School, Moses Lake
Moses Lake Christian Academy, Moses Lake
Quincy High School, Quincy
Royal High School, Royal City
Skilskin High School, Grand Coulee
Soap Lake High School, Soap Lake
Wahluke High School, Mattawa
Warden High School, Warden

Grays Harbor County 
Elma High School, Elma
Harbor High School, Aberdeen
Hoquiam High School, Hoquiam
Lake Quinault High School, Amanda Park
Montesano Junior-Senior High School, Montesano
North Beach High School, Ocean Shores
Ocosta High School, Westport
J. M. Weatherwax High School, Aberdeen
Wishkah Valley School, Aberdeen

Island County 
Coupeville High School, Coupeville
Midway Alternative School, Oak Harbor(closed 2006)
Oak Harbor High School, Oak Harbor
South Whidbey High School, Langley

Jefferson County
Chimacum High School, Chimacum
Jefferson Community School, Port Townsend
Port Townsend High School, Port Townsend
Quilcene High School, Quilcene

King County
Auburn School District
Auburn High School, Auburn
Auburn Mountainview High School, Auburn
Auburn Riverside High School, Auburn
West Auburn High School, Auburn
Bellevue School District
Bellevue High School, Bellevue
Interlake High School, Bellevue
International School, Bellevue
Newport High School, Bellevue
Sammamish High School, Bellevue
Enumclaw School District
Enumclaw High School, Enumclaw
Federal Way School District
Decatur High School, Federal Way
Federal Way High School, Federal Way
Harry S. Truman High School, Federal Way
Internet Academy, Federal Way
Thomas Jefferson High School, Auburn
Todd Beamer High School, Federal Way
Highline School District
Academy of Citizenship and Empowerment, SeaTac
Raisbeck Aviation High School, Tukwila
Evergreen High School, White Center
Glacier High School, SeaTac (closed)
Global Connections High School, SeaTac
Highline High School, Burien
Mount Rainier High School, Des Moines
Odyssey — The Essential School, SeaTac
Kent School District
Kent-Meridian High School, Kent
Kentlake High School, Kent
Kentridge High School, Kent
Kentwood High School, Covington
Issaquah School District
Issaquah High School, Issaquah
Liberty Senior High School, Renton
Skyline High School, Sammamish
Tiger Mountain Community High, Issaquah
Lake Washington School District
BEST High School, Kirkland 
Eastlake High School, Sammamish
International Community School, Kirkland
Juanita High School, Kirkland
Lake Washington High School, Kirkland
Redmond High School, Redmond
Tesla STEM High School, Redmond
Mercer Island School District
Mercer Island High School, Mercer Island
Northshore School District
Bothell High School, Bothell
Inglemoor High School, Kenmore
North Creek High School, Bothell
Woodinville High School, Woodinville
Innovation Lab High School, Bothell
Renton School District
Black River High School, Seattle
Hazen High School, Renton
Lindbergh High School, Renton
Renton High School, Renton
Riverview School District
Cedarcrest High School, Duvall
Seattle Public Schools
Ballard High School, Seattle
Broadway High School, Seattle (closed)
The Center School, Seattle
Grover Cleveland High School, Seattle
Chief Sealth International High School, Seattle
Franklin High School, Seattle
Garfield High School, Seattle
Nathan Hale High School, Seattle
Ingraham High School, Seattle
Lincoln High School, Seattle
John Marshall Alternative School, Seattle (closed)
Middle College High School, Seattle
The Nova Project, Seattle
Queen Anne High School, Seattle (closed)
Rainier Beach High School, Seattle
Roosevelt High School, Seattle
Seahawks Academy, Seattle (closed)
South Lake High School, Seattle
West Seattle High School, Seattle
Shoreline School District
Shorecrest High School, Shoreline
Shoreline High School, Shoreline (closed)
Shorewood High School, Shoreline
Skykomish School District
Skykomish High School
Snoqualmie Valley Public Schools
Mount Si High School, Snoqualmie
Two Rivers School, North Bend
Tahoma School District
Tahoma High School, Maple Valley
Tukwila School District
Foster High School, Tukwila
Vashon School District
Vashon Island High School, Vashon

Private Schools
Auburn Adventist Academy, Auburn
Bear Creek School, Redmond
Bellevue Christian School, Bellevue
Bishop Blanchet High School, Seattle
The Bush School, Seattle
Cedar Park Christian School, Bothell
Christian Faith School, SeaTac
Chrysalis School, Woodinville
Dartmoor School, Bellevue, Issaquah, Seattle, Woodinville
Eastside Catholic School, Sammamish
Eastside Preparatory School, Kirkland
Evergreen Lutheran High School, Des Moines
Forest Ridge School of the Sacred Heart, Bellevue
Holy Names Academy, Seattle
John F Kennedy Memorial High School, Burien
Kent View Christian Senior High School, Auburn
King's Schools, Shoreline
Lakeside School, Seattle
Northwest School, Seattle
Northwest Yeshiva High School, Mercer Island
O'Dea High School, Seattle
Overlake High School, Redmond
Puget Sound Adventist Academy, Kirkland
St. Christopher Academy, Seattle
Seattle Academy of Arts and Sciences, Seattle
Seattle Christian Schools, SeaTac
Seattle Lutheran High School, Seattle
Seattle Preparatory School, Seattle
Seattle Urban Academy, Seattle
Seattle Waldorf School, Seattle
Spring Academy, Seattle
University Preparatory Academy, Seattle
Washington Academy of Performing Arts, Redmond

Kitsap County
Bainbridge High School, Bainbridge Island
Bremerton High School, Bremerton
Central Kitsap High School, Silverdale
Eagle Harbor High School, Bainbridge Island
Kingston High School, Kingston
Klahowya Secondary School, Silverdale
North Kitsap High School, Poulsbo
Olympic High School, Silverdale
Renaissance High School, Bremerton
South Kitsap High School, Port Orchard
Spectrum Community School, Kingston

Kittitas County
Cle Elum-Roslyn High School, Cle Elum
Easton High School, Easton
Ellensburg High School, Ellensburg
Kittitas High School, Kittitas
Thorp High School, Thorp

Klickitat County
Columbia High School, White Salmon
Glenwood Secondary School, Glenwood
Goldendale High School, Goldendale
Klickatat High School, Klickitat
Lyle Middle & High School, Lyle
Trout Lake High School, Trout Lake
Wishram High School, Wishram

Lewis County
Centralia High School, Centralia
Green Hill Academic School, Chehalis
Mossyrock Middle & High School, Mossyrock
Napavine High School, Napavine
Onalaska High School, Onalaska
Toledo High School, Toledo
W. F. West High School, Chehalis
White Pass Junior-Senior High School, Randle
Winlock Senior High School, Winlock
Morton High School, Morton
Pe Ell High School, Pe Ell
Adna High School, Adna

Lincoln County
Christian Heritage School, Edwall
Creston High School, Creston
Davenport High School, Davenport
Harrington High School, Harrington
Odessa High School, Odessa
Reardan High School, Reardan
Sprague High School, Sprague
Wilbur High School, Wilbur

Mason County
Mary M Knight School, Matlock
North Mason Senior High School, Belfair
Shelton High School, Shelton
Choice Alternative High School, Shelton

Okanogan County
Brewster High School, Brewster
Liberty Bell Junior-Senior High School, Winthrop
Okanogan Junior-Senior High School, Okanogan
Omak Alternative High School, Omak
Omak High School, Omak
Oroville High School, Oroville
Pateros High School, Pateros
Tonasket High School, Tonasket
North County Christian School, Oroville
Lake Roosevelt High School, Coulee Dam

Pacific County
Ilwaco High School, Ilwaco
Naselle Junior Senior High Schools, Naselle
Raymond Junior Senior High School, Raymond
South Bend High School, South Bend
Willapa Valley Junior Senior High School, Menlo

Pend Oreille County
Cusick Junior Senior High School, Cusick
Newport High School, Newport
Selkirk Junior-Senior High School, Ione

Pierce County
Bethel School District
Bethel High School, Spanaway
Graham-Kapowsin High School, Graham
Spanaway Lake High School, Spanaway
Clover Park School District
Clover Park High School, Lakewood
Lakes High School, Lakewood
Franklin Pierce School District
Washington High School, Parkland
Franklin Pierce High School, Parkland
Gates Secondary School, Parkland
Peninsula School District
Gig Harbor High School, Gig Harbor
Henderson Bay Alternative High School, Gig Harbor
Peninsula High School, Gig Harbor
Puyallup School District
Emerald Ridge High School, Puyallup
Puyallup High School, Puyallup
E. B. Walker High School, Puyallup
Governor John R. Rogers High School, Puyallup
Steilacoom Historical School District #1
Steilacoom High School, Steilacoom
Sumner School District
Bonney Lake High School, Bonney Lake
Sumner Senior High School, Sumner
Tacoma Public Schools
Henry Foss High School, Tacoma
Lincoln High School, Tacoma
Mount Tahoma High School, Tacoma
Oakland Alternative High School, Tacoma
Science and Math Institute, Tacoma
Silas High School (formerly "Wilson"), Tacoma
Stadium High School, Tacoma
Tacoma School of the Arts, Tacoma
Others
Carbonado K-8th School, Carbonado
Curtis Senior High School, University Place
Eatonville High School, Eatonville
Fife High School, Tacoma
Orting High School, Orting
White River High School, Buckley
Private Schools
Annie Wright School, Tacoma
Bellarmine Preparatory School, Tacoma
Cascade Christian Junior and Senior High School, Puyallup
Charles Wright Academy, Tacoma
Covenant High School, Tacoma
Life Christian School, Tacoma
Mount Rainier Lutheran High School, Tacoma
Northwest Christian School, Puyallup
Tacoma Baptist High School, Tacoma

San Juan County
Friday Harbor High School, Friday Harbor
Lopez Island High School, Lopez Island
Orcas Island High School, Eastsound

Skagit County
Anacortes High School, Anacortes
Burlington-Edison High School, Burlington
Concrete High School, Concrete
La Conner High School, La Conner
Mount Vernon High School, Mount Vernon
Mount Vernon Christian High School, Mount Vernon
Emerson High School, Mount Vernon
Sedro-Woolley High School, Sedro-Woolley
State Street High School, Sedro-Woolley
Twin Cedars High School, Concrete

Skamania County
Stevenson High School, Stevenson

Snohomish County
Arlington School District
Arlington High School, Arlington
Weston High School, Arlington
Edmonds School District
Edmonds Woodway High School, Edmonds
Lynnwood High School, Bothell 
Meadowdale High School, Lynnwood
Mountlake Terrace High School, Mountlake Terrace
Scriber Lake High School, Lynnwood
Everett Public Schools
Cascade High School, Everett
Everett High School, Everett
Henry M. Jackson High School, Mill Creek
Sequoia High School, Everett
Lake Stevens School District
Lake Stevens High School, Lake Stevens
PROVE High School, Lake Stevens
Lakewood School District
Lakewood High School (Washington)
Marysville School District
Marysville Arts & Technology High School, Marysville
Marysville Alternative High School, Marysville
Marysville Junior High School, Marysville (grade 9 only)
Marysville Getchell High School, Marysville
Marysville Pilchuck High School, Marysville
Tulalip Heritage School
Mukilteo School District
ACES Alternative High School, Everett
Kamiak High School, Mukilteo
Mariner High School, Everett
Snohomish School District
AIM High School, Snohomish
Snohomish High School, Snohomish
Glacier Peak High School, Snohomish
Stanwood School District
Lincoln Hill High School, Stanwood
Stanwood High School, Stanwood
Other Public Schools
Darrington High School, Darrington
Granite Falls High School, Granite Falls
Monroe High School, Monroe
Sultan Senior High School, Sultan
Private Schools
Archbishop Thomas J. Murphy High School, Everett
Arlington Christian School, Arlington (K-12)
Grace Academy, Marysville (K-12)
Grace Chapel Christian School, Mountlake Terrace (1-12)
Harvest Time Church School, Lynnwood (1-12)
Hillcrest Academy, Everett (1-12)
Master's Touch Christian School, Marysville (K-12)
Montessori Schools-Snohomish County, Everett (K-12)
Northwest Christian School, Everett (K-12)
Pacific Learning Center NW, Lynnwood (K-12)
Solomon Christian School, Edmonds (7-12)

Spokane County
Central Valley School District, Spokane Valley
Central Valley High School, Spokane Valley
Mica Peak High School, Spokane Valley
Ridgeline High School, Liberty Lake
Spokane Valley Tech, Spokane Valley
University High School Spokane Valley
Cheney School District
Cheney High School, Cheney
Three Springs High School, Cheney
Deer Park School District
Deer Park High School
East Valley School District
East Valley High School, Spokane Valley
Freeman School District
Freeman High School, Rockford
Liberty School District
Liberty High School, Spangle
Mead School District
Five Mile Prairie, Spokane
Mead Senior High School, Spokane
Mt. Spokane High School, Mead
North Star School
Medical Lake School District 
Medical Lake High School, Medical Lake
Medical Lake Endeavors, Medical Lake
Newport School District
Newport High School
Pend Oreille River School
Nine Mile Falls School District
Lakeside High School, Nine Mile Falls
Reardan-Edwall School District
Reardan Middle & High School 
Riverside School District
Riverside High School, Chattaroy
Rosalia School District (Joint School District with Whitman County)
Rosalia High School
Spokane School District
Joel E. Ferris High School, Spokane
Lewis & Clark High School, Spokane
North Central High School, Spokane
On Track Academy, Spokane
Pratt Academy, Spokane Valley
John R. Rogers High School, Spokane
Shadle Park High School, Spokane
The Community School at Bancroft, Spokane
Bryant Center/TEC, Spokane
NEWTech Skill Center, Spokane
St. John School District (Joint School District with Whitman County)
St. John-Endicott High School
Tekoa School District (Joint School District with Whitman County)
Tekoa High School
West Valley School District
Dishman Hills High School, Spokane Valley
West Valley High School, Spokane Valley
Spokane Valley High School, Spokane
Private
Covenant Christian School, Spokane Valley (private)
Enlightium Academy, Spokane (private)
Gonzaga Preparatory School, Spokane (private)
Northwest Christian School, Colbert (private)
The Oaks Classical Christian Academy, Spokane Valley (private)
Palisades Christian Academy, Spokane (private)
St. George's School, Spokane (private)
Saint Michael's Academy, Spokane (private)
Upper Columbia Academy, Spangle (private)
Valley Christian School, Spokane Valley (private)

Stevens County
Colville High School, Colville
Jenkins High School, Chewelah
Kettle Falls High School, Kettle Falls
Northport High School, Northport
Mary Walker High School, Springdale
Wellpinit Junior Senior High School, Wellpinit
Lakeside High School, Nine Mile Falls

Thurston County

Olympia School District, Olympia
Avanti High School
Capital High School
Olympia High School
 Olympia Regional Learning Academy
North Thurston Public Schools, Lacey
North Thurston High School
River Ridge High School
South Sound High School
Timberline High School
Rainier School District
Rainier High School, Rainier
Rochester School District
Rochester High School, Rochester
Tenino School District
Tenino High School, Tenino
Tumwater School District
A.G. West Black Hills High School, Tumwater
New Market Skills Center, Tumwater
Tumwater High School, Tumwater
Yelm Community Schools
Yelm High School, Yelm
Other high schools
Eagle View Christian School, Yelm
Maple Lane School, Centralia
Northwest Christian High School, Lacey
Pope John Paul II High School, Lacey

Wahkiakum County
Wahkiakum High School, Cathlamet

Walla Walla County
 Columbia High School, Burbank
 DeSales Catholic High School, Walla Walla
 Jubilee Christian Academy
 Prescott Junior Senior High School, Prescott
 Waitsburg High School, Waitsburg
 Walla Walla High School, Walla Walla
 Walla Walla Valley Academy, College Place
 Touchet High School, Touchet

Whatcom County
Bellingham High School, Bellingham
Blaine High School, Blaine
Clearview Alternative High School, Ferndale
Cornerstone Christian School, Lynden
Explorations Academy, Bellingham
Ferndale High School, Ferndale
Lummi High School, Bellingham
Lynden High School, Lynden
Lynden Christian High School, Lynden
Meridian High School, Bellingham
Mount Baker Senior High School, Deming
Nooksack Valley High School, Everson
Options High School Bellingham School District Alternative High School, Bellingham
Sehome High School, Bellingham
Squalicum High School, Bellingham
Timber Ridge Alternative High School, Mount Baker, Meridian, and Nooksack fed
Windward High School, Ferndale

Whitman County
Colfax High School, Colfax
Colton High School, Colton
Garfield-Palouse High School, Palouse
Lacrosse High School, Lacrosse
Oakesdale High School, Oakesdale
Pullman High School, Pullman
Pullman Christian School, Pullman
St. John/Endicott High School, St. John
Tekoa High School, Tekoa

Yakima County
A.C. Davis High School, Yakima
Eagle High School, Toppenish
East Valley High School, Yakima
Eisenhower High School, Yakima
Grandview High School, Grandview
Granger High School, Granger
Highland High School, Cowiche
La Salle High School, Union Gap
Mabton Junior-Senior High School, Mabton
Naches Valley High School, Naches
Riverside Christian School, Yakima
Selah High School, Selah, Washington
Selah Academy
Sunnyside Christian High School, Sunnyside
Sunnyside High School, Sunnyside
Toppenish High School, Toppenish
Wapato High School, Wapato
Wellpinit-Fort Semco High School, White Swan
West Valley High School, Yakima
White Swan High School, White Swan
Yakama Tribal School, Toppenish
Zillah High School, Zillah

See also 
List of school districts in Washington
List of private schools in Washington
List of high schools in Washington by WIAA league alignment

External links 
List of Washington high school alumni sites at alumni archive.
List of high schools in Washington from SchoolTree.org

Washington, high schools
High